"Drill Call" is a bugle call which sounds as a warning to turn out for drill.

References
Bands.Army.Mil

Bugle calls